Tin Shui Estate is a public housing estate in Tin Shui Wai, New Territories, Hong Kong, near Tin Shui Wai Hospital, Tin Shui Wai Park and Light Rail Tin Shui stop. It is the second public housing estate in Tin Shui Wai New Town. It is divided into Tin Shui (I) Estate and Tin Shui (II) Estate, and consists of 12 residential buildings completed in 1993.

Tin Oi Court is a Home Ownership Scheme court in Tin Shui Wai, near Tin Shui Estate. It consists of two blocks built since 28 October 1993.

Houses

Tin Shui (I) Estate

Tin Shui (II) Estate

Tin Oi Court

Demographics
According to the 2016 by-census, Tin Shui Estate had a population of 23,878 while Tin Oi Court had a population of 3,724. Altogether the population amounts to 27,602.

Politics
For the 2019 District Council election, the estate fell within two constituencies. Most of the estate and Tin Oi Court is located in the Shui Oi constituency, which was formerly represented by Sandy Lai Po-wa until October 2021, while the remainder of the estate falls within the Shui Wah constituency, which was formerly represented by Lam Chun until July 2021.

See also

Public housing estates in Tin Shui Wai

References

Tin Shui Wai
Public housing estates in Hong Kong
Residential buildings completed in 1993